The Adil Shahi  dynasty of South Indian sultans, ruled the  Bijapur Sultanate from 1490 to 1686.

Adil Shahi dynasty
Bijapur, Karnataka
Adil